Brindeau is a French surname.

List of people with the surname 

 Jeanne Brindeau (1860–1946), French stage and film actress
 Pascal Brindeau (born 1974), French politician

See also 

 Brandau (surname)

French-language surnames
Surnames of French origin